The Esoteric is an American hardcore/rock band founded in 1996 from Lawrence, Kansas. They are currently signed to Prosthetic Records. Following several self-produced EPs, the band's debut full-length, With the Sureness of Sleepwalking, came out on Prosthetic Records in 2005. Their follow-up, Subverter, released on Prosthetic in 2006 and received good reception from online blogs and music magazines.

The Kansas outfit is quick to point out and pay homage to their influences and support their fellow local bands. The band has toured with the likes Himsa, Mastodon, Dog Fashion Disco, Mindless Self-Indulgence, Scarlet, Calico System, and Fight Paris.

On January 1, 2007, the band announced the departures of guitarist Cory White and drummer Marshall Kilpatric.  White left the band based on personal reasons while Kilpatric relocated to Los Angeles to join Black Light Burns.  Former drummer Adam 'Hammerlord' Mitchell retook the throne at the drums for a short Canadian tour.  Although not officially reformed, White and Kilpatrick rejoined the band for a few select shows in the Kansas City area in 2009 including the American Waste Festival. In 2011, the band covered the track "Iron Clad Lou" for the compilation album Songs of Farewell and Departure: A Tribute To HUM.

Most current lineup 
 Eric Graves – guitar
 Anthony Diale – bass
 Stevie Cruz – vocals
 Marshall Kilpatrick – drums, percussion
 Cory White – guitar

Discography 

 Esoteric EP (1998)
 Mowdown Music Compilation (1999)
 Derailer Split (1999)
 An Illusion of Sacred Circumstances (1999)
 Malicious Intent: Ultimus Dies Sepulcris (compilation) (2001)
 Lifeless Records 2001 Compilation (2001)
 Plagued by Visions (2001)
 Live at CBGB's NYC (Luddite Clone / The Esoteric split CD) (2001)
 Loaded in Lawrence (compilation) (2002)
 Roads Between (The Esoteric / Saved By Grace split CD) (2002)
 A Reason to Breathe EP (2002)
 Wormwood Split (2003)
 1336 EP (2004)
 With the Sureness of Sleepwalking (2005)
 Subverter (2006) 
 For the Sick: A Tribute to Eyehategod (2007)

References

External links 

Interview with the Esoteric at Heavy Frequency

Rock music groups from Kansas
Musical groups established in 1996
1996 establishments in Kansas
Metalcore musical groups from Kansas